Lady Punisher could refer to:

Lynn Michaels, a Marvel Comics character seen in the Punisher comic books
The Lady Punisher, a 1994 film from Thailand